Ovruch (also Ovruch Southwest) is an air base in Zhytomyr Oblast, Ukraine located 8 km southwest of Ovruch. There are three large parking areas for fighters.

The base appears to have capacity for about 50 planes.

The airbase itself is used for purpose of storage and utilization of airplanes.

Staffing 
Units stationed at Ovruch include the 4070th BRSV, with just over 140 Sukhoi Su-17 aircraft as of 1992).

References 

Soviet Air Force bases
Soviet Naval Aviation bases